Adrian Ryan Forde is a Barbadian politician. He is a member of parliament in the House of Assembly of Barbados. He was first elected member of parliament in January 2018. He also serves as the Minister of Environment and National Beautification in the cabinet of Mia Mottley.

References 

Living people
Barbadian politicians
Barbados Labour Party politicians
Government ministers of Barbados
Year of birth missing (living people)